Lithocarpus dasystachyus is a tree in the beech family Fagaceae. The specific epithet  is from the Greek meaning "thickly hairy spike", referring to the inflorescence.

Description
The greyish brown bark is smooth, flaky or fissured.

Distribution and habitat
Lithocarpus dasystachyus is endemic to Borneo. Its habitat is peat swamp and kerangas forests, sometimes hill dipterocarp forests, up to  altitude.

References

dasystachyus
Endemic flora of Borneo
Trees of Borneo
Plants described in 1864
Flora of the Borneo lowland rain forests